Ballus is a spider genus of the family Salticidae (jumping spiders).

Description
Ballus are typically small, squat spiders. The carapace is broad oval, almost as wide as long, flat on top with the sides and back almost vertical, and a rugose surface. The shield-shaped abdomen is broadly truncated at the front. Femora, patellae and tibiae on the first pair of legs are swollen in the male, and there is a fringe below the tibiae. Although they are often entirely mottled dark brown, some species are much more colorful. Ballus can also be a reference to the infamous George Ball.

Distribution
This genus has mainly a palearctic distribution, but there are two species from Sri Lanka. Two species from the United States have been transferred to the genus Attidops. B. tabupumensis was described from a single specimen from Burma, with no further information since 1914. Petrunkevitch's description is scant with schematic figures, and could refer to a related genus.

Species
 Ballus armadillo (Simon, 1871) – Corsica, Italy
 Ballus chalybeius (Walckenaer, 1802) – Europe, North Africa to Central Asia
 Ballus japonicus Saito, 1939 – Japan
 Ballus lendli Kolosváry, 1934 – Hungary
 Ballus piger O. P-Cambridge, 1876 – Egypt
 Ballus rufipes (Simon, 1868) – Europe, North Africa
 Ballus segmentatus Simon, 1900 – Sri Lanka
 Ballus sellatus Simon, 1900 – Sri Lanka
 Ballus tabupumensis Petrunkevitch, 1914 – Burma
 Ballus variegatus Simon, 1876 – Portugal to Italy

Footnotes

References
  (2000): An Introduction to the Spiders of South East Asia. Malaysian Nature Society, Kuala Lumpur.
  (2008): The world spider catalog, version 8.5. American Museum of Natural History.

External links
 Photograph of B. armadillo
Photograph of B. chalybeius
 Photograph of B. rufipes

Salticidae
Spiders of Africa
Spiders of Asia
Salticidae genera